Beechland, near Natchez, Mississippi, is a historic vernacular Greek Revival-style plantation house at the end of a mile-long plantation drive.  It is listed on the National Register of Historic Places.

It is a one-and-a-half-story frame house set upon brick foundation piers. It has a steeply pitched gabled roof pierced by two interior brick chimneys.

It was listed on the National Register in 1982;  the owner then planned to renovate the house.

References

Houses on the National Register of Historic Places in Mississippi
Houses in Natchez, Mississippi
Greek Revival houses in Mississippi
National Register of Historic Places in Natchez, Mississippi